Charles Cottet (21 July 1863 – 25 September 1925) was a French painter. He was born in Le Puy-en-Velay and died in Paris.

Biographical detail

Although not born in Brittany it was a visit there in 1886 that led to a life-time fascination with the region and Cottet made many further visits over the years, especially to the area around Ouessant.

Works involving l'Île d'Ouessant
This region was particularly attractive to Cottet and paintings linked to the Ouessant included-

Other major works in the Musée d'Orsay

Apart from the composition "Au pays de la mer : Ceux qui s'en vont, Le repas d'adieu Celles qui restent" other paintings in the Musée d'Orsay depicting scenes relating to Brittany include:-

Works held in the Musėe des beaux-Art Quimper

Apart from "L'Enfant mort" mentioned above, the following paintings can be seen in Quimper.

Other works

Gallery

Notes

1.In the 1890s, Cottet led the movement known as the Bande noire. This group included Lucien Simon, Edmond Aman-Jean, André Dauchez, George Desvallières, and Maurice Denis, all influenced by the realism and dark colours of Courbet.

2.Cottet painted many works unrelated to Brittany such as the 1896 "View of Venice from the Sea" and "Seascape with Distant View of Venice", both in the Hermitage, St. Petersburg. In 1894 he was awarded a bursary which enabled him travel to Italy and Egypt where he completed many paintings.

References

External links
 Cottet paintings in Le Havre

1863 births
1925 deaths
19th-century French painters
French male painters
20th-century French painters
Post-impressionist painters
École des Beaux-Arts alumni